Cheryl L. Pollak (born 1953) is an American attorney and the Chief Magistrate of the United States District Court for the Eastern District of New York. She was appointed to the court in 1995.

Education and career

Pollak graduated with a Bachelor of Arts magna cum laude from Princeton University in 1975. In 1978, she earned her Juris Doctor from the University of Chicago Law School, where she was articles and book review editor for the University of Chicago Law Review. After graduating from law school, Pollak served as a law clerk to Judge William H. Timbers on the United States Court of Appeals for the Second Circuit. Between 1979 and 1986, she was an associate at Davis Polk & Wardwell in New York.

In August 1986, Judge Pollak became an Assistant United States Attorney for the Eastern District of New York, where she served as chief of the Narcotics and Organized Crime Drug Enforcement Task Force Unit from 1991 to 1994, and deputy chief of the Criminal Division from 1994 to 1995.  She also served as International Affairs and National Security Coordinator for the United States Attorney's Office. She remained there until her appointment as a Magistrate Judge in November 1995.

Pollak is a member of the American Bar Association and the Association of the Bar of the City of New York, where she has served on various committees.

References

1953 births
Living people
Princeton University alumni
University of Chicago Law School alumni
United States magistrate judges
20th-century American judges
Davis Polk & Wardwell lawyers